The Mabira Forest is a rainforest area covering about  in Uganda, located in Buikwe District, between Lugazi and Jinja. It has been protected as Mabira Forest Reserve since 1932. It is home for many endangered species like the primate Lophocebus ugandae.

Geography
The Mabira forest lies north of Lake Victoria. The reserve covers an area of 30,038 ha. It lies on gently undulating country, with many flat-topped hills separated by wide stream valleys. Elevations range from 1070 to 1340 m above sea level. Although Lake Victoria lies close to the reserve's southern boundary, the forest is drained by streams that empty generally northward into the Victoria Nile.

The forest reserve is surrounded by agricultural areas. The reserve completely or partially surrounds approximately 27 settled enclaves.

Ecology
Mabira Forest is the largest remaining block of semi-evergreen rainforest in the Victoria Basin forest-savanna mosaic ecoregion. The reserve is secondary forest, and has been subject to long-term human influence. Logging began in the early 20th century, and the characteristic trees East African mahogany (Khaya anthotheca) and mvule (Milicia excelsa) that were present in the 1950s have been since mostly been cut down for their valuable timber. During the 1970s and 80s the government allowed banana and coffee plantations in the reserve.

The reserve is home to over 300 species of birds and nine species of primates.

Mabira as a source of rubber
The Mabira forest was leased in 1900 by the East Africa and Uganda Exploration Company, who then set up the Mabira Forest (Uganda) Rubber Company to handle the concession. Their hopes of obtaining 500,000 lbs per annum from the forest proved unrealistic: the cost of clearing the dense forest around individual trees was too expensive, particularly on account of the poor yields which they got for each tree. As a result, the company moved from exploiting wild rubber to planting cultivated rubber, and also coffee.

Deforestation plans 
President Yoweri Museveni and his cabinet supported this plan.

The deforestation plans were disputed within Uganda. While environmental activists feared the loss of hundreds of endangered species, increased erosion, the damage of livelihoods of local people and negative impacts on water balance and regional climate, supporters hoped for the creation of jobs. A cabinet paper said the plan would generate 3,500 jobs and contribute USh 11.5 billion to the treasury.

The Kabaka (King) of Buganda opposed the deforestation plan and has offered alternative land for sugarcane production. The Anglican church of Mukono has also offered land.

At least three people were killed during a demonstration of about 1,000 for the protection of the Mabira Forest. There were also riots against Asians, since the Mehta Group is Indian-owned. SCOUL plantations were set on fire, and e-mails and SMS calling for the boycott of SCOUL's Lugazi sugar circulated.

President Museveni defended the deforestation plans, saying that he shall ”not be deterred by people who don't see where the future of Africa lies”. According to him, the Save Mabira activists ”don't understand that the future of all countries lies in processing”. In May 2007, the Ugandan environmental minister announced that the deforestation plans were suspended and that the government is trying to find alternative land for the Mehta Group.

See also
 Central Forest Reserves of Uganda

Sources 

Protest against deforestation plans on EcoEarth.info
BBC News: Deaths in Uganda forest protest
BBC News: Uganda leader defends forest plan
BBC News: Ugandan plan for forest suspended
Save Mabira Petition

External links 
Mabira Forest: Ugandans Wake Up to the Cost Of Disappearing Forests in Uganda
Racial Violence, Deaths Rock Kampala As Rioter Protest Mabira Forest Giveaway

Buikwe District
Forests of Uganda
Forest reserves of Uganda
Geography of Uganda
Important Bird Areas of Uganda
Protected areas of Uganda
Victoria Basin forest–savanna mosaic